Aleksandrs Semjonovs (born 8 June 1972) is a retired professional ice hockey centre who is currently general manager of IFK Arboga IK in the Swedish Division 1 league.

Semjonovs has played in many different countries throughout his career, playing in Latvia, Russia, Finland, Denmark, Sweden and Germany.

Semjonovs also played for the Latvian national ice hockey team and has played more games for his country (209) than any other player.

Career statistics

Regular season and playoffs

International

External links
 
 
 
 

1972 births
Living people
AaB Ishockey players
Latvian expatriate ice hockey people
Heilbronner EC players
Herning Blue Fox players
Ice hockey players at the 2002 Winter Olympics
Ice hockey players at the 2006 Winter Olympics
IF Björklöven players
IFK Arboga IK players
Leksands IF players
Latvian ice hockey centres
Malmö Redhawks players
Olympic ice hockey players of Latvia
Ice hockey people from Riga
Traktor Chelyabinsk players
Vojens IK players
Soviet ice hockey centres
Latvian expatriate sportspeople in Sweden
Latvian expatriate sportspeople in Finland
Latvian expatriate sportspeople in Denmark
Latvian expatriate sportspeople in Germany
Expatriate ice hockey players in Sweden
Expatriate ice hockey players in Denmark
Expatriate ice hockey players in Russia
Expatriate ice hockey players in Germany
Expatriate ice hockey players in Finland
Latvian expatriate sportspeople in Russia